Lally may refer to:

People with the surname
 Andy Lally, American racing driver
 Anne Rigney, formerly Anne Rigney Lally, Irish artist and sculptor
 Declan Lally, Irish GAA footballer
 Gerard Lally, Irish Jacobite
 Eugene F. Lally, American aerospace engineer, photographer, entrepreneur
 Gérard de Lally-Tollendal, French politician
 Jade Lally, British discus thrower
 James Lally, Irish County Galway landowner
 Joe Lally, American musician
 Margaret Lally "Ma" Murray, Canadian publisher's wife
 Marquis de Lally-Tollendal, Irish-French Jacobite family
 Maureen Lally-Green, American judge
 Mick Lally, Irish theatre actor
 Pat Lally (footballer), English footballer
 Pat Lally (politician), Scottish politician
 Paul M. Lally, American television producer, writer, and director
 Seán Ó Maolalaidh (fl. 1419–1480), Chief of the Name
 Thomas Arthur, comte de Lally, French general

People with the given name
 Lally Bowers, British actress
 Lally Cadeau, Canadian actress
 Lally Katz, Australian dramatist
 Lally Stott, British songwriter
 Lally Weymouth, American journalist and newspaper heiress

Other uses
 Lally School of Management & Technology, part of Rensselaer Polytechnic Institute, Troy, New York
 Lally column, a vertical support column
 Lally, Saskatchewan, an old name used for the community of Quill Lake, Saskatchewan, in Canada

Surnames of Irish origin